(German: Youth office) is a German and Austrian local agency set up to promote the welfare of children. Each district or district-free city has its own . Its structure is flat, with no centralised (state or federal) coordinating office. 
Since the local organizations function independently there is no federal administrative supervision.

Statistics
The Federal Statistics Bureau shows a steep rise in the number of children with problems taken by  yearly into safeguarding.
23,432 in 1995
25,664 in 2005
77,645 in 2015
61,383 in 2017

Among the children (age 0–13) more than 50% return to their parents within two weeks.

See also
 Children's rights
 European Center for Constitutional and Human Rights
 Human rights in Germany
 Parliamentary Petitions Office
 Helmut Kentler

Similar organizations in other countries 
  and  Netherlands
 Child Protective Services USA
 Children and Family Court Advisory and Support Service England and Wales
 Norwegian Child Welfare Services

References

External links
 General Jugendamt website in German language with an English brochure Jugendamt - What youth welfare offices do (pdf)
 The Bamberg Declaration, adopted in the framework of the international symposium on "German youth welfare offices and the European Convention on Human Rights" Bamberg, 20/21 October 2007, Chair: Annelise Oeschger, President of the International Nongovernmental Organizations Conference of the Council of Europe (INGO)
 Individual UPR Submission by the League for Childrens' [sic] Rights

Child-related organisations in Germany
Children's rights in Germany
European Court of Human Rights cases involving Germany
Human rights in Germany
Human rights in Austria
Child-related organisations in Austria